Kaempferia nigrifolia is a plant species in the genus Kaempferia subgenus kaempferia found in Nakhon Nayok Province and Saraburi Province, Thailand. It is similar to Kaempferia pulchra.

References

nigrifolia
Flora of Thailand
Plants described in 2021